Henry I. Taylor (July 28, 1862 – April 10, 1943) was a Canadian politician. He served in the Legislative Assembly of New Brunswick as member of the Conservative party representing Charlotte County from 1908 to 1935.

References

1862 births
1943 deaths
20th-century Canadian politicians
Politicians from Saint John, New Brunswick
Progressive Conservative Party of New Brunswick MLAs